Palazzo Borromeo ("Borromeo Palace") is a 13th-century building located at street #12 of Piazza Borromeo in Milan, region of Lombardy, Italy, . It stands across a small piazza from the church of Santa Maria Podone and a statue dedicated to the 16th-century archbishop and cardinal, St Charles Borromeo.

History
The palace was built in the 13th century for the House of Borromeo. At the time, the Borromeo (originally from Florence) were quickly increasing their wealth and power in Milan and Northern Italy, partly through their good relationship with Duke Francesco Sforza. The palace eventually became the centre of a sort of "Borromeo citadel" within the city proper. The Borromeo used the area for celebrations and events such as chivalrous tournaments. The palace was also renowned for housing a prestigious art collection.

The palace has a late Gothic facade, which has nevertheless undergone several major modifications through the centuries (and most notably after being damaged by bombings in World War II).

The main feature of the facade is the large doorway, decorated with white and red marble. The inner courtyard is the part of the palace that is best preserved; some of the original frescoes are still visible, some representing the tourneys held by the Borromeo are found in one of the rooms of the palace, known as the "architecture study"; they are credited to painter Michelino da Besozzo.

The palace is still the property of the Borromeo family.

References

Sources

 Attilia Lanza, Milano e i suoi palazzi: Porta Vercellina, Comasina e Nuova, Libreria Meravigli Editrice, Milan 1993

Houses completed in the 13th century
Borromeo
Renaissance architecture in Milan
Tourist attractions in Milan
Gothic architecture in Milan